Indian Idol Junior is an Indian Hindi-language reality television singing competition and is part of Indian Idol. It began broadcasting on Sony Entertainment Television from 1 June 2013. Karan Wahi and Mandira Bedi were hosts of the show which was judged by music duo Vishal–Shekhar and with playback singer Shreya Ghoshal.

A second season started on 30 May 2015. The new judges were Salim Merchant and Sonakshi Sinha, while Vishal Dadlani reprised his role as the judge. The show was hosted by Hussain Kuwajerwala and co-hosted by Asha Negi. Ananya Sritam Nanda was the winner for the second season.

A third season started on August. The new judges were Anu Malik and Sonakshi Sinha, while Vishal Dadlani reprised his role as the judge. The show was hosted by Manish Paul and co-hosted by Asha Negi.

Summary

Indian Idol Junior Season 1

Judges
Vishal DadlaniShreya GhoshalShekhar Ravjiani

Host
Karan WahiMandira Bedi

Top 11 Contestants

Indian Idol Junior Season 2

Indian Idol Junior Season 2 started on30 May 2015 and finished on 6 September 2015.
Judges
Salim MerchantSonakshi Sinha replaced Shalmali Kholgade Vishal Dadlani

Host
Hussain KuwajerwalaAsha Negi

Top 13 Contestants

References

External links
 

Indian Idol
Sony Entertainment Television original programming
2013 Indian television seasons
Reality television spin-offs
Indian television spin-offs
Indian television series based on British television series
Television series about children